Robert Fico's First Cabinet was the cabinet of Slovakia from 2006 to 2010, under the leadership of Prime Minister Robert Fico.

Government ministers

Deputy Prime Ministers

See also 
 Fico's Second Cabinet

External links
Official Website

Government of Slovakia
Cabinets established in 2006
2006 establishments in Slovakia
2010 disestablishments in Slovakia
Cabinets disestablished in 2010
Direction – Social Democracy
Slovak government cabinets